Cedicus is a genus of  araneomorph spiders in the family Cybaeidae, and was first described by Eugène Simon in 1875.

Species
 it contains five species:
Cedicus bucculentus Simon, 1889 – Himalayas
Cedicus dubius Strand, 1907 – Japan
Cedicus flavipes Simon, 1875 (type) – Eastern Mediterranean
Cedicus israeliensis Levy, 1996 – Turkey, Israel
Cedicus pumilus Thorell, 1895 – Myanmar

References

Araneomorphae genera
Cybaeidae
Spiders of Asia
Taxa named by Eugène Simon